Wu Yican (born 1964) is a Chinese scientist specializing in nuclear neutron physics and application Technology. He works as a researcher and director of Hefei Institutes of Physical Science. He is also the director of Institute of Nuclear Energy Safety Technology, Chinese Academy of Sciences.

Education
Wu was born in Susong County, Anhui in 1964. He secondary studied at Chengji High School. He received his bachelor's degree and master's degree from Xi'an Jiaotong University in 1985 and 1988, respectively. He earned his doctor's degree from the Institute of Plasma Physics, Chinese Academy of Sciences in 1992.

Career
After graduation, he was assigned to Hefei Institutes of Physical Science. He is a member of the Chinese Nuclear Society (CNS), Chinese Nuclear Physics Society (CNPS), Chinese Institute of Electronics, and China Society of Radiation Protection. He is a member of the Computational Medical Physics Working Group (CMPWG) of American Nuclear Society (ANS).

Honours and awards
 September 16, 2018 SOFT Innovation Prize
 November 15, 2018 ANS FED Outstanding Achievement Award
 March 17, 2019 Fellow of the International Atomic Energy Agency (INEA)
 November 22, 2019 Member of the Chinese Academy of Sciences (CAS)

References

External links
 Wu Yican on the Institute of Nuclear Energy Safety Technology, Chinese Academy of Sciences

1964 births
Living people
People from Susong County
Xi'an Jiaotong University alumni
Scientists from Anhui
Members of the Chinese Academy of Sciences